Eremaea × phoenicea is a plant in the myrtle family, Myrtaceae and is endemic to the south-west of Western Australia. It is thought to be a stabilised hybrid between two subspecies of Eremaea. It is an erect to spreading shrub with pointed, elliptic leaves and small groups of flowers, a shade of pink to red, on the ends of the branches.

Description
They have a covering of fine hairs and one, rarely three veins on the lower surface.

The flowers are rose-coloured to red and occur in groups of one to four on the end of branches formed the previous year. The stamens, which give the flower its colour, are arranged in 5 bundles, each containing 19 to 26 stamens. Flowering occurs from October to November and is followed by fruits which are woody capsules.

Taxonomy and naming
Eremaea × phoenicea was first formally described in 1993 by Nuytsia in Nuytsia (journal) from a specimen found near Eneabba. Hnatiuk considers Eremaea x phoenicea to be a stabilised hybrid between Eremaea beaufortioides and Eremaea violacea subsp. rhaphiophylla. That view is supported by isozyme studies.

The name phoenicea is derived from the Ancient Greek word φοῖνιξ (phoînix) meaning “purple” or "crimson" alluding to the flower colour of this species.

Distribution and habitat
Eremaea × phoenicea occurs in the Irwin district in the Geraldton Sandplains biogeographic region where it grows in sand in kwongan and heath.

Conservation
Eremaea × phoenicea is classified as "not threatened" by the Western Australian Government Department of Parks and Wildlife.

References

phoenicea
Myrtales of Australia
Plants described in 1993
Endemic flora of Western Australia
Hybrid plants